The Roxy London WC2 is a live album of recordings taken from various punk bands that played at The Roxy club in Covent Garden, London between January and April 1977.

Overview
The original Harvest Records release in 1977 (cat. no. SHSP 4069) included tracks by Eater, Johnny Moped, and the Unwanted that were left off the 1991 Receiver reissue (cat. no. RR 132). Also, the Boys, the Damned, Sham 69 and U.K. Subs appeared on the reissue but not the original. Finally, even for bands that appear on both discs, some of the tracks have been changed (e.g. Wire's "1 2 X U", X-Ray Spex' "Oh Bondage Up Yours!", etc.) The Receiver album was re-released in 2001 by Sanctuary as a double CD set.

The original 12-track album reached No. 24 in the UK Albums Chart and spent five weeks in the chart. The album was described as "seminal" by The Virgin Encyclopedia of Popular Music and others. In 2004, it was recognised as one of the five "Classic Punk Rock Compilation LPs" of all-time, with writer Johnny Normal declaring, "Capturing the full force of the first wave head on, The Roxy is an essential historical reminder of the power and the glory of punk rock". Author and critic Dave Thompson called it "one of the most important (and poorest sounding) live albums ever made, a document of the Roxy Club from on and off stage". However, it has also been described as "a punk rock album of 10 unknown acts who can barely play".

Paul Marko's book The Roxy London WC2: A Punk History (2007) delved deeper, featuring more obscure bands than those on this compilation.

Track listing
Side one
 "Runaway" (Mick Rossi, Wayne Barrett) by Slaughter & the Dogs
 "Boston Babies" (Rossi, Barrett) by Slaughter & the Dogs
 "Freedom" (Olli Wisdom, Mark Nelson, Danny Destroy, Paul Grotesque) by the Unwanted
 "Lowdown" (Bruce Gilbert, Graham Lewis, Colin Newman, Robert Gotobed) by Wire
 "1 2 X U" (Gilbert, Lewis, Newman, Gotobed) by Wire
 "Bored Teenagers" (T.V. Smith) by the Adverts

Side two
"Hard Loving Man" (Paul Halford) by Johnny Moped
 "Don't Need It" (Andy Blade, Ian Woodcock, Brian Chevette, Dee Generate) by Eater
 "15" (Michael Bruce, Alice Cooper, Dennis Dunaway, Neal Smith, Glen Buxton) by Eater
 "Oh Bondage Up Yours!" (Poly Styrene) by X-Ray Spex
 "Breakdown" (Pete Shelley, Howard Devoto) by Buzzcocks
 "Love Battery" (Shelley, Devoto) by Buzzcocks

1991 reissue
 "Runaway" by Slaughter & the Dogs
 "Boston Babies" by Slaughter & the Dogs
 "Rip Off" by Sham 69
 "Borstal Breakout" by Sham 69
 "Just Don't Care" by Wire
 "TV" by Wire
 "Bored Teenagers" by the Adverts
 "Gary Gilmore's Eyes" by the Adverts
 "Living in the City" by the Boys
 "Sabre Dancing" by the Boys
 "Sick On You" by the Boys
 "Oh Bondage, Up Yours!" by X-Ray Spex
 "I Am a Cliche" by X-Ray Spex
 "Orgasm Addict" by Buzzcocks
 "Breakdown" by Buzzcocks
 "Love Battery" by Buzzcocks
 "World War" by U.K. Subs
 "I Couldn't Be with You" by U.K. Subs
 "Smash It Up" by the Damned
 "Neat Neat Neat" by the Damned

References

1977 live albums
Harvest Records live albums
1977 compilation albums
Harvest Records compilation albums
Punk rock compilation albums
Live punk rock albums
Albums produced by Mike Thorne
Punk rock albums by British artists
Sanctuary Records live albums
Sanctuary Records compilation albums
Compilation albums by British artists